Gilbert Gray (1576–1614), was the second principal of Marischal College, Aberdeen.

Life

He was born in Aberdeen in 1576 the son of Gilbert Gray, baillie in Aberdeen. His maternal uncle was Alexander Rutherford, Provost of Aberdeen. He was educated at Edinburgh University, graduating MA in 1592, then did further studies at King's College, Aberdeen and Heidelberg University.

Gray was appointed to the post of Principal in 1598 aged only 22, in place of Robert Howie (who moved to Dundee then became Principal of St Andrews University). He was a pupil of Robert Rollock, the first principal of the university of Edinburgh, whose virtues and learning he extolled in a curious Latin oration which he delivered in 1611, entitled ‘Oratio de Illustribus Scotiæ Scriptoribus.’ Several of the authors eulogised in it are fictitious. Gray accepted literally ‘the fabulous stories of Fergus the First having written on the subject of law 300 years B.C.; Dornadilla a century after composing rules for sportsmen; Reutha, the 7th king of Scotland, being a great promoter of schools and education; and King Josina, a century and a half before the Christian era, writing on botany and the practice of medicine.’ Gray died in December 1614 being buried on the 29th.

Family

He married Marjorie Menzies and had two sons, Thomas and William, both of whom were later city burgesses.

Publications

Funeral service of Duncan Liddel

References

1576 births
1614 deaths
16th-century Scottish people
17th-century Scottish people
Scottish educators
17th-century Scottish writers